Tau Cancri (τ Cancri) is a solitary, yellow-hued star in the zodiac constellation of Cancer. With an apparent visual magnitude of +5.42, it is faintly visible to the naked eye. Based upon an annual parallax shift of 11.92 mas as seen from Earth, it is located around 274 light-years from the Sun.

With an age of about 620 million years and a stellar classification of G8 III, this is a red-clump giant star, which indicates that it has evolved onto the horizontal branch and is generating energy through helium fusion at its core. It is a microvariable, showing a luminosity variation of 0.04 in magnitude. Tau Cancri has an estimated 2.4 times the mass of the Sun and 7.8 times the Sun's radius.

References

G-type giants
Horizontal-branch stars
Cancri, Tau
Cancer (constellation)
Durchmusterung objects
Cancri, 72
078235
044818
3621